Dulanab (also Romanized as Dūlānāb; also known as Dolanab and Dūlehnāb) is a village in Zanjanrud-e Pain Rural District, Zanjanrud District, Zanjan County, Zanjan Province, Iran. At the 2006 census, its population was 689, in 156 families.

References 

Populated places in Zanjan County